Mary Pride (born ) is an American author and magazine producer on homeschooling and Christian topics. She is best known for her homeschooling works, but has also written on women’s roles, computer technology in education, parental rights, and new age thought from a conservative evangelical perspective. For her role in authoring guides for the homeschooling movement, Pride has been described as "the queen of the home school movement" and as a "homeschooling guru". Stemming from her first book, The Way Home, she is also considered an activist in the Christian Quiverfull movement.

Early life
Pride was born in New York City, New York, in 1955. She graduated from high school at age 15, after which she entered Rensselaer Polytechnic Institute where she earned a bachelor's degree in electrical engineering in 1974, and a master's degree in computer systems engineering a year later. She married her husband Bill around this time and both soon converted to Evangelical Christianity. Pride had formerly considered herself a feminist activist.

Before the first of Pride’s nine children were born, she had decided to homeschool them. The lack of homeschooling guides she encountered prompted her to begin writing her own.

Influence 
According to Kathryn Joyce, Pride's 1985 book The Way Home "did much to recreate the homeschooling movement along patriarchal and militantly fertile lines."

Books and views

On women's roles and contraception

In Pride's first book, The Way Home: Beyond Feminism, Back to Reality, she chronicled her journey away from what she argued were feminist and anti-natal ideas of happiness, within which she had lived as an activist before her conversion to conservative evangelical Christianity in 1977. She described her discovery of happiness surrounding what she felt was the Biblically mandated role of wives and mothers as bearers of children and workers in the home under the authority of a husband. Pride argued that such a lifestyle was Biblically required of married Christian women but that most had been unknowingly duped by feminism. She meanwhile countered in the book various versions of Christian feminism.

As the basis for her arguments, Pride selected numerous Bible verses from which to lay out what she felt was the Biblical role of women. These included verses she saw as containing her ideas of the importance of childbearing and forswearing any form of birth control.  Pride argued that the mindset that led to use of family planning was a root cause for inadequate influence in the world by the Christian religion.

She explained that she believed Christian couples should not attempt to limit the number of children they have or to space them out in any way, writing that God would then take over the family planning: There is an alternative to scheming and plotting how many babies to have and when to have them. It can be summed up in three little words: trust and obey. If God is willing to plan my family for me (and we Christians all do believe that God loves us and has a wonderful plan for our lives), then why should I muddle up his plan with my ideas? Only God knows the future. Only he knows how much money we will have next year, or when I will reach menopause, or when his Kingdom will desperately need the unique talents of my yet-to-be-conceived son or daughter. Why not leave the driving up to him?Pride's rejection of every method of family planning in The Way Home was soon noticed by prominent members of the Couple to Couple League, a Catholic natural family planning (NFP) movement. John and Sheila Kippley in their The Art of Natural Family Planning describes how representatives of the organization contacted Pride to express concerns over her position. In 1989, Pride in her HELP for Growing Families periodical published portions of the correspondence between the Kippleys' and herself, during which Pride accepted NFP use only for couples who wished to remain healthy until they were ready to use no fertility control at all. Sheila Kippley credits the correspondence as the reason why Pride accepted NFP in such circumstances in her sequel, All the Way Home.

On child abuse and children's rights 
In chapter 7 (called "Who Owns Our Kids?") of The Way Home, Pride wrote that there is never biblical justification for removing a child from the home, even in cases of abuse. She claimed that the true goal of the children's rights movement was actually to undermine parental rights, not to protect children, and she used the example of Sweden to suggest that outlawing spanking might result in high rates of suicide among young people. She also claimed that "[a]ny attempt to control a child at all, from spanking to sending him to Christian school to sending him to his room, is grounds for the state screaming 'Abuse!' and stepping in to take him away. In places where the children's rights people are active, parents have been convicted for ridiculous things like forbidding their children to attend movies." Sources were not provided for any of these claims.

Criticism

Mitchell Stevens, a Hamilton College sociologist, has criticized Pride for exhibiting feminist values in her lifestyle much more than in what she espouses. Similarly, Frank Schaeffer, who was the agent for Pride's book The Way Home, wrote in 2015 that "[t]he irony was that Pride preached a dogmatic, stay-at-home, follow-your-man philosophy for other women while turning her lucrative home-schooling empire into a one-woman industry."

Publications

Books
The Way Home (Crossway Books, 1985)
The Big Book of Home Learning (Crossway Books, 1986)
The Next Book of Home Learning (Crossway Books, 1987)
The New Big Book of Home Learning (Crossway Books, 1988)
All the Way Home (Crossway Books, 1989)
The Child Abuse Industry (Crossway Books, 1986)
Schoolproof (Crossway Books, 1988); (Blackstone Audio Books, 2002)
Unholy Sacrifices of the New Age and Ancient Empires of the New Age (Crossway Books, 1988, 1989 both with Paul deParrie)
The “Old Wise Tales” series (Wolgemuth & Hyatt, 1990): Too Many Chickens, The Greenie, The Better Butter Battle, Baby Doe
The Big Book of Home Learning 4 volumes: Getting Started, Preschool & Elementary, Teen & Adult, Afterschooling (Crossway Books, 1991)
Pride’s Guide to Educational Software with husband Bill Pride (Crossway, 1997)
The Big Book of Home Learning 3 volumes: Getting Started, Preschool & Elementary, Junior High Through College (Alpha Omega Publications, 1999)
Mary Pride’s Complete Guide to Getting Started in Homeschooling (Harvest House, 2004)

Periodicals
HELP For Growing Families
Practical Homeschooling
Big Happy Family
Homeschool PC

See also
Antifeminism

References

External links
Homeschool World
Practical Homeschooling Magazine

1955 births
Living people
Writers from New York City
American evangelicals
Converts to Christianity
Anti-contraception activists
Rensselaer Polytechnic Institute alumni
Homeschooling advocates
20th-century American writers
21st-century American writers
20th-century American women writers
21st-century American women writers
Female critics of feminism